Hassan Mzonge (born 12 June 1972) is a Tanzanian boxer. He competed in the men's welterweight event at the 1996 Summer Olympics.

References

1972 births
Living people
Tanzanian male boxers
Olympic boxers of Tanzania
Boxers at the 1996 Summer Olympics
Place of birth missing (living people)
Welterweight boxers